Octagon buildings and structures are characterized by an octagonal plan form, whether a perfect geometric octagon or a regular eight-sided polygon with approximately equal sides.

The oldest known octagon-shaped building is the Tower of the Winds in Athens, Greece, which was constructed circa 300 B.C. Octagon houses were popularized in the United States in the mid-19th century and there are too many to list here, see instead List of octagon houses. There are also octagonal houses built in other times and cultures.

Below is a list of octagonal buildings and structures worldwide, excluding houses and windmills.

Australia
 The office pods of Callam Offices in Canberra
 Chinaman's Hat an octagonal gazebo-like structure in the South Channel of Port Phillip Bay
 The Octagon Theatre at the University of Western Australia.
 The old site of Hotel Saville in South Yarra, Melbourne, now unofficially referred to as The Blocktagon, which was renovated into a residential dwelling made up of six octagonal apartments during the eleventh season of reality show The Block.
 Nauru House 80 Collins Street, Melbourne

Canada

At least 19 historic octagon houses are known to exist in Canada distributed across 4 eastern provinces. For a list of these houses, See: List of octagon houses.  In Canada, the octagon house craze also engendered an octagonal deadhouse phenomenon. This included octagonal deadhouses, pre-burial edifices, built in the mid to late 1800s along Yonge Street in south-central Ontario, from just north of Toronto to Aurora.

 Bastion Nanaimo, British Columbia
 Chapel at Dundurn, Hamilton, Ontario
 Miscou Island Lighthouse – strategic Baie des Chaleurs octagonal colonial lighthouse
 Huron County Gaol – distinctive octagonal jail design, 1839–41
 Pachena Point Light on Vancouver Island, British Columbia
 Speedside United Church, in Centre Wellington, Ontario

China
 Liaodi Pagoda, China (1000s)
 Lingxiao Pagoda, China (860)
 Also many other pagodas

Egypt
 Lighthouse of Alexandria
 Pharos of Abusir
 The Octagon

Ethiopia
St. George's Cathedral, Addis Ababa

Sri Lanka
Temple of the Tooth

Germany

 Palatine Chapel in Aachen, built c. 972
 Dragon House, 1870 garden folly, Sanssouci Park, Potsdam, Germany
 Kaiser Wilhelm Memorial Church, built 1961

Greece
 Tower of the Winds, Athens, Greece

Hungary
 Rumbach Street synagogue, Budapest

India
 Satyagnana Sabha, Vadalur, Vadalur, Tamil Nadu

Iran
 Ferdows Religious School, Toon
 Jabalieh

Israel
 Dome of the Rock, Jerusalem. 687-691 CE
 Chapel of the Ascension, Jerusalem c. 382 CE by Saint Helena; original octagonal shrine has been reconstructed multiple times.

Italy
 The Baptistery (5th century), Albenga
 Baptistery of San Giovanni, Florence. (1059)
 The Battistero or Baptistery of Parma (1196)
 Basilica of San Vitale, Ravenna (547)
 Castel del Monte (Apulia), Andria (BT) (1240s)
 Church of St. Giacomo, Vicovaro (1400s)
 Tribuna of the Uffizi, Florence (1584)

Japan 

 Yumedono at Hōryū-ji, Ikaruga (739)
 Octagonal Hall of Eisan-ji, Gojō (760-764)
 Hokuendō of Kōfuku-ji, Nara (1210)
 Saiendō of Hōryū-ji, Ikaruga (1250)
 Main Hall of Keikyuin of Kōryū-ji, Kyoto (1251)
 Three-Story Pagoda of Anraku-ji, Ueda (1290s)
 Aizendō of Tōfuku-ji, Kyoto (1333-92)
 Main Hall of Busshō-ji, Mito (1585)
 Nanendō of Kōfuku-ji, Nara (1789)
 Nippon Budokan, Tokyo (1964)
 Pagoda of Genjo Sanzoin Complex in Yakushi-ji, Nara (1991)
 Sugamo Ohdai Kannondō in Taisho University, Tokyo (2013)

New Zealand
 The Octagon, the former Trinity Congregational Church in Christchurch, New Zealand

Norway

 Ankenes Church
 Bardu Church
 Buvik Church
 Dolstad Church, mixed octagonal-cruciform
 Klæbu Church
 Røssvoll Church
 Støren Church
 Trinity Church (Oslo), octagonal-cruciform combined
 Vinje Church (Hemne)

Portugal

 Convent of Christ (Tomar, Portugal), 12th-15th Century. The adjacent chapel is only one of two octagonal chapels in the world. The other is in Jerusalem.
 Charola, Portuguese Info on the Chapel of the Convent of Christ.

Singapore

 Lau Pa Sat, a dining hall and market

Spain

 Alcazar of Jerez de la Frontera has an Octagonal Tower, in Almohad style
 El Miguelete is the bell tower of the Valencia Cathedral.

Sweden
 Hedvig Eleonora Church, Stockholm (1737)

United Kingdom

 Abbot's Kitchen, Glastonbury
 Abbot's Kitchen, Oxford
 Avenue Methodist Church in Sale, Greater Manchester
 Dutch Cottage, Rayleigh, Essex
 18th century replicas of the Athenian Tower of the Winds in the ornamental gardens of the following stately homes:
 Mount Stewart
 Shugborough Hall
 West Wycombe Park
 Naze tower, Walton on the Naze
 Octagonal chapter houses at the following cathedrals:
 Liverpool Cathedral
 Salisbury Cathedral
 Southwell Minster
 Truro Cathedral
 Wells Cathedral
 York Minster
 Octagon Centre, Sheffield
 Octagonal lantern tower, Ely Cathedral, Ely
 Octagon Chapel, Norwich
 Octagon Temple at Cliveden
 Dreghorn & Springside Parish Church
 St James Church, Teignmouth
 Great Pagoda, Kew Gardens, London
 Storm Tower at Compass Point, Bude, Cornwall
 St. John’s Methodist Church, Arbroath
 United Reformed Church in Cheadle Hulme
 The main tower of Hadlow Castle, Kent
 The Butter Market, Barnard Castle, County Durham
 Hertford College's Middle Common Room, Oxford

United States

See also

 Octagon house
 List of octagon houses

References

Octagonal